Kateryna Dikidzhi (born July 11, 1991) is a Ukrainian swimmer, who specialized in sprint freestyle events. She sprinted to two gold medals in the 50 and 100 m freestyle at the 2007 European Junior Swimming Championships in Antwerp, Belgium, with respective times of 25.95 and 56.51.

As a 17-year-old teen, Dikidzhi teamed up with Darya Stepanyuk, Nataliya Khudyakova, and Hanna Dzerkal for the Ukrainian squad in the women's 4 × 100 m freestyle relay at the 2008 Summer Olympics in Beijing. Swimming the second leg, Dikidzhi recorded a split of 55.44 seconds, and the Ukrainian went on to finish the prelims in fourteenth overall with a final time of 3:44.72.

References

External links
NBC Olympics Profile

1991 births
Living people
Ukrainian female swimmers
Olympic swimmers of Ukraine
Swimmers at the 2008 Summer Olympics
Ukrainian female freestyle swimmers
Sportspeople from Rivne
21st-century Ukrainian women